Autograph Collection is a group of independent upper-upscale to luxury hotels within the Marriott International portfolio. The properties are independently owned and operated under the Autograph Collection name.

History
To grow in the post-2008 economic downturn, Marriott, known for its rigid uniformity, was willing to relax this stipulation to draw independent unique hotels to its network of franchised properties. In 2010, Marriott approached Richard Kessler, an independent hotelier and former CEO of Days Inn, to incorporate the seven Kessler boutique properties into its system, under a yet unnamed new brand.

In 2006, Kessler had dropped the Westin brand affiliation from his downtown Orlando hotel to operate independently. Initially reluctant, Kessler came to an acceptable arrangement. The hotels would operate autonomously, keeping their names and identities. The Autograph Collection launched that year, with the Kessler properties forming the bulk of the hotel inventory. This freedom may seem unfair to branded properties, sometimes subject to intransigent brand standards or extra fees, but the difference is that these independents bear the cost of creating their own brand identities from scratch.

The new name highlighted not a brand, but a collection of hotels. The Leading Hotels of the World, targeting high-end customers looking for unique hotel experiences, had long dominated this market. Not displaying the Marriott branding or Marriott booking engine on the Autograph website, not only emphasized the unique experiences of these independent hotels, but also shielded the hospitality giant's various brands from fallout should the venture fail.

The selection included historical landmark buildings rejuvenated into the 21st century, but offering a hotel experience far different from a normal “cookie-cutter” property. The collection sought hotels that possessed an element of authentic local flavor and cultural distinction to provide guests with an enriching stay. The experience itself, and service, replaced the traditional definitions of luxury, such as the number of bathroom fixtures and thread count of the bed sheets and drapes. In addition to displaying hotels by location, guests could search the website by specifying unique preferences, such as culinary, historic exploration, arts, family, sports and urban.

Over time, the growth emphasis shifted from adding existing properties to proposals and new builds that incorporated the desired features. Financing for the latter projects could be more readily available to the owner, because lenders regard projects affiliated with a large hotel chain as less risky. In 1990, two-thirds of all hotels were independent, but today, less than 40 percent are independently owned and operated. Historically, hotels were branded or independent, now the expanding soft brand category falls in the middle. In 2018, there were about 475,000 independent hotels, and only around 55,000 in the soft category, but the number is expected to grow as soft branding becomes more mainstream.

Most independent hotels in strong market positions spurn offers to join a larger group. Whereas advantageous in a buoyant economy, during a downturn, the backing from the diverse customer base of a big brand might be a savior. Major soft brands launches were Ascend by Choice (2008), Autograph by Marriott (2010), Curio by Hilton (2014), Best Western Premier (2014), Unbound by Hyatt (2016), and Trademark by Wyndham (2017). Marriott continues to promote growth in its three soft brands, The Luxury Collection, Tribute Portfolio, and Autograph.

To the guest, a soft brand hotel possesses the distinctive identity, design style, and regional flair of a leading independent property. To the hotelier, it accesses the global marketing channels, customer loyalty rewards program, staff training model, seamless back-of-house operational standards, and new technologies, provided by Marriott or its rivals. These hotels are free to retain their own personality, and make their own decisions on features such as uniforms, cuisine, and furniture. Where significant renovations or operational changes are a prerequisite to joining the group, these can be a hurdle. Ongoing fees are 5 to 10 percent of room revenue. Marriott does not disclose this percentage. In addition, the major online travel booking sites charge 15 to 30 percent commission. However, larger companies like Marriott use their market power to negotiate the lowest rates from those agents. Twelve months after a conversion to the Autograph Collection, independent hotels have experienced an average RevPAR percentage increase of 19.8 percent and an average RevPAR index percentage change of 12.5 percent.

In January 2017, Autograph began the Independent Film Initiative at the Sundance Film Festival with the Autograph Collection Hotels & The Black List Sundance Social Space. The Annual Black List is a comprehensive list of strong screenplays that require financing. Autograph has its own indie film channel for hotel guests. The Autograph Collection Short Film Award was created to discover new talent and accelerate the development of independent filmmakers. Furthermore, Autograph provides a complimentary one-week hotel stay to chosen writers as an opportunity to develop their work.

The Autograph Collection comprises a portfolio of 4- and 5-star properties that have ranged from a 15-room boutique hunting lodge in the Colorado mountains to the 3,400-room Atlantis Resort on Paradise Island, The Bahamas.

Accommodations

Historical

From 2015

Select properties
As of June 30, 2020, the Autograph Collection consisted of 199 hotels in over 32 countries, with another 95 hotels with 16,941 rooms in its pipeline.

Belgium
Sapphire House in Antwerp (2022)

Brazil
The Hotel & Spa do Vinho in Bento Gonçalves

British Virgin Islands
The Scrub Island Resort, Spa & Marina in the British Virgin Islands

Canada
Civic Hotel, Surrey, BC
The Algonquin Resort St. Andrews By-The-Sea, St Andrews, NB
The Kananaskis Mountain Lodge, Kananaskis Village, AB
The Hotel Saskatchewan, Regina, SK
The Douglas, Vancouver, BC
Humaniti Hotel Montreal by Autograph Collection, Montreal, QC
Muir Hotel, Halifax, NS
The Pearle Hotel & Spa, Burlington, ON

China
The Shanhaitian Resort in Sanya

Colombia
The Artisan D.C. Hotel in Bogota

Costa Rica
The Hotel Punta Islita in Guanacaste
El Mangroove, Gulf of Papagayo
Planet Hollywood Costa Rica, Gulf of Papagayo

Estonia
The Hotel Telegraaf in Tallinn

France
The Boscolo Exedra Nice in Nice
The Hotel de Bourgtheroulde in Rouen
The L'Hermitage Gantois in Lille
La Caserne Chanzy Hotel & Spa in Reims
La Maison Rouge Hotel & Spa in Strasbourg

Georgia
 Paragraph Resort & Spa Shekvetili, Autograph Collection in Shekvetili

Germany
The Hotel Elephant in Weimar
The Hotel am Steinplatz in Berlin
The Roomers in Munich
The Hotel Gewandhaus Dresden Dresden
Schloss Lieser in the Moselle region
The Hotel Atlantic in Hamburg
The Villa Rothschild in Koenigstein im Taunus
The Falkenstein Grand in Koenigstein im Taunus

Greece
The Domes of Elounda in Crete
The Domes Noruz Chania in Crete

Hungary
The New York Palace, The Dedica Anthology in Budapest

Indonesia
Sari Pacific Jakarta in Jakarta
The Stones Legian in Bali

Ireland
Shelbourne Hotel in Dublin
The Powerscourt Hotel in Wicklow

Israel
The Publica Isrotel in Herzliya

Japan
The Prince Sakura Tower Tokyo
The Prince Kyoto Takaragaike
Mesm Tokyo

Mexico 

 The Royalton Splash in Cancún
 The Royalton Riviera in Cancún
 The Hideaway at Royalton Riviera in Cancún
 The Royalton CHIC in Cancún
 Planet Hollywood Adult Scene in Cancún

Netherlands
Hotel Nassau Breda in Breda

Panama
The Buenaventura in Río Hato
The Sortis Hotel in Panama City

Poland
Stradom House in Cracow
Hotel Verte in Warsaw

Portugal
The Fontecruz Lisboa in Lisbon

South Korea
The Plaza in Seoul
RYSE Hotel in Seoul
GRAVITY Seoul Pangyo in Seongnam, Gyeonggi
Hotel Onoma in Daejeon

Spain
The Ercilla de Bilbao Hotel in Bilbao
The Cotton House Hotel in Barcelona
The Eugénie De Montijo in Toledo
The Hotel Circulo Grand Via in Madrid
The Hotel Palacio del Carmen in Santiago de Compostela

Malaysia
The Majestic Hotel Kuala Lumpur
STRIPE Hotel Kuala Lumpur

Turkey
The Sofa Istanbul in Istanbul
The Orientbank in Istanbul

United Arab Emirates
The Habtoor Grand Resort in Dubai
The La Ville Hotel City Walk in Dubai
The Lapita Resort in Dubai

United Kingdom
The Bankside Hotel in London
The Hotel Xenia in Kensington
The Glasshouse in Edinburgh
The Threadneedles Hotel in London
The University Arms Hotel in Cambridge

United States
The Hotel Adagio in San Francisco, California
The Adolphus Hotel in Dallas, Texas,
The Advenire in St. George, Utah
The Algonquin Hotel Times Square in Manhattan, New York City, New York
The Ambassador Hotel in Wichita, Kansas
The Arrowhead Springs Hotel and Spa in Lake Arrowhead, California
The Hotel at Avalon in Alpharetta, Georgia
The Hotel Blackhawk in Davenport, Iowa
The Blackstone in Chicago, Illinois 
The Blue Moon Hotel in Miami Beach, Florida
The Brown Palace Hotel in Denver, Colorado
Hotel Carmichael in Carmel, Indiana
The Casa Monica Hotel in St. Augustine, Florida
The Castle Hotel in Orlando, Florida
The Cosmopolitan of Las Vegas in Las Vegas, Nevada
The Cloudveil in Jackson, Wyoming 
The Hotel Chicago Downtown in Chicago, Illinois
The Current Iowa in Davenport, Iowa
The Historic Davenport in Spokane, Washington
The Daytona in Daytona Beach, Fl.
Hotel Distil in Louisville, Kentucky
The Draftsman in Charlottesville, Virginia
The Hotel Duval in Tallahassee, Florida
The Éilan Hotel & Spa in San Antonio, Texas,
The Elliot Park Hotel in Minneapolis, Minnesota
The Farnam in Omaha, Nebraska
The Grand Bohemian Hotel in Orlando, Florida
The Grand Hotel in Fairhope, Alabama
The Henry in Dearborn, Michigan
The Hi-Lo Hotel in Portland, Oregon
The Hotel Icon in Houston, Texas,
The Industrialist Hotel in Pittsburgh, Pennsylvania
The Inn at Bay Harbor in Bay Harbor, Michigan
The Koloa Landing Resort in Koloa, Hawaii
The Laylow in Honolulu, Hawaii
The Lexington Hotel in New York City
The Mansion on Forsyth Park in Savannah, Georgia
The Mauna Kea Beach Hotel in Kohala Coast, Hawaii
The Mayflower Hotel in Washington, DC
The MC Hotel in Montclair, New Jersey
Hotel Metro in Milwaukee, Wisconsin
The Metropolitan at The 9 in Cleveland, Ohio
The Morrison House in Alexandria, Virginia
The Hotel Northland in Green Bay, Wisconsin
The Notary Hotel in Philadelphia, Pennsylvania
The Oaklander Hotel in Pittsburgh, Pennsylvania
The Paso Del Norte in El Paso, Texas
The Pier South Resort in Imperial Beach, California
The Press Hotel in Portland, Maine
The Raphael Hotel in Kansas City, Missouri
The Saint in New Orleans, Louisiana
The StateView in Raleigh, North Carolina
The Siena Hotel in Chapel Hill, North Carolina′
The Triada in Palm Springs, California
The Union Station Hotel in Nashville, Tennessee
Westdrift Manhattan Beach, California
The Warrior in Sioux City, Iowa

Gallery

References

Autograph Collection Hotels
Marriott International brands